Deledda is an Italian surname. Notable people with the surname include:

Adolphe Deledda (1919–2003), Italian cyclist
Alessio Deledda (born 1994), Italian racing driver
Grazia Deledda (1871–1936), Italian writer
Noah Deledda (born 1977), American artist

See also
Deledda International School, a school in Genoa, Italy

Italian-language surnames